A payment gateway is a merchant service provided by an e-commerce application service provider that authorizes credit card or direct payments processing for e-businesses, online retailers, bricks and clicks, or traditional brick and mortar. The payment gateway may be provided by a bank to its customers, but can be provided by a specialised financial service provider as a separate service, such as a payment service provider.

A payment gateway facilitates a payment transaction by the transfer of information between a payment portal (such as a website, mobile phone or interactive voice response service) and the front end processor or acquiring bank.

Payment gateways are a service that helps merchants initiate ecommerce, in-app, and point of sale payments for a broad variety of payment methods. The gateway is not directly involved in the money flow; typically it is a web server to which a merchant's website or POS system is connected. A payment gateway often connects several
acquiring banks and payment methods under one system.

Typical transaction processes
When a customer orders a product from a payment gateway-enabled merchant, the payment gateway performs a variety of tasks to process the transaction.

 A customer places an order on website by pressing the 'Submit Order' or equivalent button, or perhaps enters their card details using an automatic phone answering service.
 If the order is via a website, the customer's web browser encrypts the information to be sent between the browser and the merchant's webserver. In between other methods, this may be done via SSL (Secure Socket Layer) encryption.  The payment gateway may allow transaction data to be sent directly from the customer's browser to the gateway, bypassing the merchant's systems. This reduces the merchant's Payment Card Industry Data Security Standard (PCI DSS) compliance obligations without redirecting the customer away from the website.
 The merchant then forwards the transaction details to their payment gateway. This is another (SSL) encrypted connection to the payment server hosted by the payment gateway.
 The payment gateway converts the message from XML to ISO 8583 or a variant message format (format understood by EFT Switches) and then forwards the transaction information to the payment processor used by the merchant's acquiring bank.
 The payment processor forwards the transaction information to the card association (I.e.: Visa/MasterCard/American Express).  If an American Express or Discover Card was used, then the card association also acts as the issuing bank and directly provides a response of approved or declined to the payment gateway. Otherwise [e.g.: MasterCard or Visa card was used], the card association routes the transaction to the correct card issuing bank.
 The credit card issuing bank receives the authorization request, verifies the credit or debit available and then sends a response back to the processor (via the same process as the request for authorization) with a response code (I.e.:: approved, denied). In addition to communicating the fate of the authorization request, the response code is also used to define the reason why the transaction failed (I.e.: insufficient funds, or bank link not available).  Meanwhile, the credit card issuer holds an authorization associated with that merchant and consumer for the approved amount. This can impact the consumer's ability to spend further (because it reduces the line of credit available or it puts a hold on a portion of the funds in a debit account).
 The processor forwards the authorization response to the payment gateway.
 The payment gateway receives the response, and forwards it onto the website, or whatever interface was used to process the payment, where it is interpreted as a relevant response, then relayed back to the merchant and cardholder. This is known as the Authorization or "Auth."
 The entire process typically takes 2–3 seconds.
 The merchant then fulfills the order and the above process can be repeated but this time to "Clear" the authorization by consummating the transaction. Typically, the "Clear" is initiated only after the merchant has fulfilled the transaction (I.e. shipped the order).  This results in the issuing bank 'clearing' the 'auth' (I.e. moves auth-hold to a debit) and prepares them to settle with the merchant acquiring bank.
 The merchant submits all their approved authorizations, in a "batch" (end of the day), to their acquiring bank for settlement via its processor. This typically reduces or "Clears" the corresponding "Auth" if it has not been explicitly "Cleared."
 The acquiring bank makes the batch settlement request of the credit card issuer.
 The credit card issuer makes a settlement payment to the acquiring bank (the next day in most cases).
 The acquiring bank subsequently deposits the total of the approved funds into the merchant's nominated account (the same day or next day). This could be an account with the acquiring bank if the merchant does their banking with the same bank, or an account with another bank.
 The entire process from authorization to settlement to funding typically takes 3 days.

Many payment gateways also provide tools to automatically screen orders for fraud and calculate tax in real time prior to the authorization request being sent to the processor. Tools to detect fraud include geolocation, velocity pattern analysis, OFAC list lookups, 'deny-list' lookups, delivery address verification, computer finger printing technology, identity morphing detection, and basic AVS checks.

 In easy words, a transaction processes with the following steps;

1: When the customer enters their card detail in the payment gateway, the payment gateway transfers it securely to the Merchant’s account.

2: Then a request is sent through your merchant account to the payment processor.
 
3: The payment processor then sends the request to the issuing(customer’s) bank.

4: If the transaction is approved the customer’s account is debited and the funds are transferred to Merchant’s(Acquiring) bank.

This is how a transaction works in simple words.

White label payment gateway 
Some payment gateways offer white label services, which allow payment service providers, e-commerce platforms, ISOs, resellers, or acquiring banks to fully brand the payment gateway’s technology as their own. This means PSPs or other third parties can own the end-to-end user experience without bringing payments operations—and additional risk management and compliance responsibility—in house, although the party offering the white labelled solution to its customers might still be responsible for some regulatory requirements such as Know your customer.

Types 

There are five main types of payment gateways.
 Local bank integration gateways - this gateway will take the customer to the merchant's website, where they can enter and exchange all their payment and contact details. After the payment has been processed, the customer will be taken back to the merchant's site with a notification of the successful transaction. This is a basic solution with limited functionalities, and it does not usually enable reimbursements or recurring payments. Thus, while it can be quickly established and implemented, it is not appropriate for businesses that plan to expand and certainly not suitable for bulk purchasers.
 Hosted payment gateways - a hosted payment gateway operates by redirecting the customer from your checkout page. When the customer is ready to complete their purchase, they can click on a 'buy now' link which will take them to the host or payment service provider's page. Then the customer enters their payment information before being sent back to your business website to finish the transaction.   This type of payment gateway provides a robust level of security with PCI compliance and fraud protection, as well as being straightforward to configure, with the host taking care of all necessary arrangements. 
 Self-hosted payment gateway - the customer's payment information is obtained directly from the merchant website. This data is then encrypted and sent to the external payment gateway for authorization. No rerouting to a different website for payment is necessary, thus the merchant has full authority over the user's payment experience.
 API-hosted gateway - the payment details and processing are managed directly on the merchant's website, through an API (Application Programming Interface). An API-hosted gateway offers a completely customosable checkout experience and can be incorporated with various systems, including mobile devices.
 Cryptocurrency payment gateway - it works similar to the other payment gateways. The merchant can receive fiat or cryptocurrency of his choice. All transactions are processed directly on the blockchain and are irreversible.

See also 
 Merchant account
 List of online payment service providers

References

Electronic funds transfer
Merchant services